Alan Max Benítez Dominguez (born 25 January 1994) is Paraguayan professional footballer who plays as a right back.

Club career
Born in Asunción, Paraguay,  Benítez started his career at Libertad in 2013, before moving to Rubio Ñu in 2015 on loan. On 1 February 2016, he joined Benfica's reserve team on loan. 

On 12 July 2022, Benítez signed with Major League Soccer side Minnesota United. On 24 February 2023, Minnesota and Benítez mutually agreed to terminate his deal at the club.

References

External links
 Benfica official profile 
 Stats and profile at LPFP  
 
 

1994 births
Living people
Sportspeople from Asunción
Association football defenders
Paraguayan footballers
Paraguayan expatriate footballers
Olympic footballers of Paraguay
Club Libertad footballers
Club Rubio Ñu footballers
S.L. Benfica B players
Club Olimpia footballers
Cerro Porteño players
Minnesota United FC players
Paraguayan Primera División players
Liga Portugal 2 players
Footballers at the 2015 Pan American Games
Paraguay international footballers
Expatriate footballers in Portugal
Paraguayan expatriate sportspeople in Portugal
Pan American Games competitors for Paraguay
Major League Soccer players